Dunford is a civil parish in the Metropolitan Borough of Barnsley,  northwest of Sheffield in South Yorkshire, England. It lies in the Peak District and within the Metropolitan Borough of Barnsley. The population of the civil parish as of the 2011 census was 568. The parish is centred on Dunford Bridge to the west and Lower Cumberworth to the east with Crow Edge virtually central between them.

The parish includes several other villages and hamlets such as Carlecotes and Flouch. There are several important water sources in the parish, such as the Broadstone, Dunford Bridge, Harden, Ingbirchworth, Royd Moor, Scout Dyke, Snailsden and the Upper and Lower Windleden Reservoirs, fed from the surrounding moorland and managed by Yorkshire Water.

History
The parish was formed in 1938 from parts of the urban districts of Holme, Newmill (Fulstone, Hepworth, Scholes) and Thurlstone.

Before the Local Government Act 1972, when South Yorkshire was formed, the parish was part of the West Riding of Yorkshire. At the time of the 2001 census it had a population of 627.

Although the parish is within South Yorkshire some members of the parish council and the clerk to the council are residents of the adjoining parish of Holmfirth in West Yorkshire.

See also
Listed buildings in Dunford

References

Civil parishes in South Yorkshire
Geography of the Metropolitan Borough of Barnsley